Collis Temple Jr. (born November 8, 1952) is an American former professional basketball player for Louisiana State University and the San Antonio Spurs in the NBA.

Career

College 
The Kentwood, Louisiana native was the first African-American to play varsity basketball at Louisiana State University (LSU). When he joined the team in 1971, the Louisiana National Guard was called to protect him from angry segregationists. In the fourth season of the Slate podcast Slow Burn, Temple shared his experiences interacting with a young David Duke while they were both students at LSU.

As a senior, Temple earned All-Southeastern Conference honors after averaging 15.0 points and 10.5 rebounds per game. In 2017, Temple was elected to the Louisiana State University Athletic Hall of Fame.

Professional
Temple was selected by the Phoenix Suns with the 94th pick of the 1974 NBA draft. He spent one season (1974–75) with the San Antonio Spurs. He averaged 1.8 points and 1.3 rebounds in 24 games.
In February 1975, he joined the Iberia Superstars of the European Professional Basketball League.

Personal
Temple has three sons and one daughter. Collis III and Garrett Temple both played at LSU.  His daughter-in-law is Miss USA 2017 winner Kára Temple.

References

1952 births
Living people
American men's basketball players
Baptists from Louisiana
LSU Tigers basketball players
People from Kentwood, Louisiana
Phoenix Suns draft picks
San Antonio Spurs players
Small forwards